Jelena Janković was the defending champion, but lost to compatriot Ana Ivanovic in the fourth round.

Caroline Wozniacki won the tournament, defeating Marion Bartoli 6–1, 2–6, 6–3 in the final. Bartoli, at 26 years and five months, had been bidding to become the tournament's oldest winner since Steffi Graf in 1996.

Seeds
All seeds received a bye into the second round.

Draw

Finals

Top half

Section 1

Section 2

Section 3

Section 4

Bottom half

Section 5

Section 6

Section 7

Section 8

Qualifying

Seeds

Qualifiers

Qualifying draw

First qualifier

Second qualifier

Third qualifier

Fourth qualifier

Fifth qualifier

Sixth qualifier

Seventh qualifier

Eighth qualifier

Ninth qualifier

Tenth qualifier

Eleventh qualifier

Twelfth qualifier

References

External links
 Main Draw and Qualifying Draw

BNP Paribas Open - Singles Qualifying
2011 BNP Paribas Open